Abrahamson is a surname. Notable people with the surname include:

 Eric Abrahamson, American politician
 James A. Abrahamson (born 1933), American Air Force general
 Kjell Albin Abrahamson (1945–2016), Swedish journalist
 Kirsten Abrahamson, Canadian ceramic artist
 Lenny Abrahamson (born 1966), Irish film and television director
 Shirley Abrahamson (1933-2020), American state supreme court chief justice for Wisconsin, United States
 Una Stella Abrahamson (1922–1999), English-born Canadian artist and writer

References 

Patronymic surnames